William Clayton Hicks (June 17, 1919 – June 9, 1999) was an American politician and businessman who served as a member of the Wisconsin State Senate from 1949 to 1953.

Early life and education
Hicks was born on June 17, 1919, in Phillips, Wisconsin. He graduated from Phillips High School and the University of Wisconsin–Madison. He later studied at Harvard Business School.

Career 
During World War II, Hicks served in the United States Army. Afterwards, he transferred to the United States Army Reserve. He was vice-president and corporate controller at Sears, Roebuck and Company.

Hicks was elected to the Wisconsin State Senate in 1948. Additionally, he was Clerk of Price County, Wisconsin. He was a Republican.

Death 
He died on June 9, 1999, in Montgomery, Texas.

References

People from Phillips, Wisconsin
County clerks in Wisconsin
Republican Party Wisconsin state senators
Businesspeople from Wisconsin
Military personnel from Wisconsin
United States Army soldiers
United States Army reservists
United States Army personnel of World War II
University of Wisconsin–Madison alumni
Harvard Business School alumni
1919 births
1999 deaths
20th-century American businesspeople
20th-century American politicians
Republican Party members of the Wisconsin State Assembly